William Dickinson (1771–1837) was an English politician, in parliament from 1796 to 1831.

Life
From a Bristol merchant family who were slave-owners in Jamaica, he was the eldest son of William Dickinson, also a Member of Parliament, and his wife Philippa Fuller, daughter of Stephen Fuller who was a London West India merchant and Jamaica agent. He was educated at Westminster School and Christ Church, Oxford where he matriculated in 1789, graduating B.A. 
in 1793, M.A. in 1795. He came into the family estate at Kingweston on his father's death.

He came to oppose Catholic emancipation.

According to the Legacies of British Slave-Ownership at the University College London, Dickinson was awarded a payment as a slave trader in the aftermath of the Slavery Abolition Act 1833 with the Slave Compensation Act 1837. The British Government took out a £15 million loan (worth £1.43 billion in 2020) with interest from Nathan Mayer Rothschild and Moses Montefiore which was subsequently paid off by the British taxpayers (ending in 2015). Dickinson was associated with five different claims, but two of those were in the capacity of executor. For the three plantations he owned (Appleton Estate, Barton Isles Pen, and Pepper Pen & Bona Vista) in Jamaica, he received £11,978 payment at the time.

Family
Dickinson married in 1803 Sophia Smith, daughter of Samuel Smith MP of Woodhall Park; they had three sons and two daughters. The children included:

Francis Henry Dickinson (1813–1890) MP, married in 1830 his first cousin Caroline Carey; she was the daughter of Major General Thomas Carey of the 3rd Foot Guards, and his wife Caroline Smith, sister of Sophia Smith.
Edmund Henry Dickinson (1821–1897), married in 1861 Emily Dulcibella Eden, daughter of Robert Eden, 3rd Baron Auckland, and was father of Robert Edmund Dickinson MP.
Sophia Gertrude (1814–1902), married in 1840 the Rev. John Stuart Hippisley Horner, and was mother of John Francis Fortescue Horner.
Caroline (1817–1886), married in 1843 William Bence-Jones.

Notes

1771 births
1837 deaths
British MPs 1796–1800
Members of the Parliament of Great Britain for English constituencies
Members of the Parliament of the United Kingdom for constituencies in Cornwall
Members of the Parliament of the United Kingdom for English constituencies
MPs for rotten boroughs
UK MPs 1801–1802
UK MPs 1802–1806
UK MPs 1806–1807
UK MPs 1807–1812
UK MPs 1812–1818
UK MPs 1818–1820
UK MPs 1820–1826
UK MPs 1826–1830
UK MPs 1830–1831
British slave owners
Recipients of payments from the Slavery Abolition Act 1833
Lords of the Admiralty